is a bright Kuiper belt object in the outer Solar System estimated to be about  in diameter. It is a large member of the Haumea family that was discovered on 15 October 2002 by the Near-Earth Asteroid Tracking (NEAT) program.

 is a classical Kuiper belt object with an absolute magnitude between that of 50000 Quaoar and 20000 Varuna.  has the most eccentric and inclined orbit of the three.

A variability of the visual brightness was also detected which could fit to 7.9 h or 15.8 h rotational period (the distinction between single or double-peaked curved could not be made with confidence). The changes in brightness are quite close to the error margin and could also be due to an irregular shape.

Orbit 

The adjacent diagrams show polar and ecliptic views of the orbits of the two cubewanos. The perihelia (q) and the aphelia (Q) are marked with the dates of passage. The present positions (as of April 2006) are marked with the spheres, illustrating relative sizes and differences in albedo (both objects appear neutral in the visible spectrum).

 is classified as a classical Kuiper belt object and follows an orbit very similar to that of : highly inclined (26°) and moderately eccentric (e ~0.12), far from Neptune's perturbations (perihelion at ~37 AU).

It has been observed 303 times, with precovery images back to 1954.

Size 

In a 2006 International Astronomical Union press release discussing the IAU 2006 draft proposal, a diagram suggested that  could be as large as 50000 Quaoar.

 occulted a relatively bright apparent magnitude 13.1 star in the constellation of Andromeda on 9 October 2009. This event was visible from Australia, possibly New Zealand, and the southern United States and Mexico. The RA and declination for this event was about 00 37 13.64 +28 22 23.2.: detailed information for observers was made available. Mike Brown lists it as a possible dwarf planet.

Surface 
The spectrum in the visible and near-infrared rages is very similar to that of Charon, characterized by neutral to blue slope (1%/1000 Å) with deep (60%) water absorption bands at 1.5 and 2.0 μm. Mineralogical analysis indicates a substantial fraction of large ice (H2O) particles. The signal-to-noise ratio of the observations was insufficient to differentiate between amorphous or crystalline ice (crystalline ice was reported on Charon, Quaoar and Haumea). The proportion of highly processed organic materials (tholins), typically present on numerous trans-Neptunian objects, is very low. As suggested by Licandro et al. 2006, this lack of irradiated mantle suggest either a recent collision or comet activity.

Origin 

Common physical characteristics with the dwarf planet Haumea together with similar orbit elements led to suggestion that  was a member of the Haumean collisional family. The object, together with other members of the family (and ), would be created from ice mantle ejected from the proto-Haumea as result of a collision with another large (around ) body.

References

External links 

 AstDys orbital elements
 

Haumea family
Classical Kuiper belt objects
Discoveries by NEAT
Objects observed by stellar occultation
20021015